Bakin may refer to:

 Takizawa Bakin, also known as Kyokutei Bakin, Japanese author
 BAKIN, the former Indonesian name of the Indonesian State Intelligence Agency
 Bakin, Esperanto name adopted by Chinese writer Ba Jin